Rada Manufacturing is a manufacturer located in Waverly, Iowa. It is the maker of Rada Cutlery. The company has been manufacturing American-made cutlery since being founded in 1948 and manufactures their products 100% in the USA. They are known for the solid aluminum handles on their cutlery, their lifetime guarantee, and for their aid to fundraisers for over 70 years.

, Gary Nelson is chairman and CEO, and Phil Jones is president.

History

Rada Cutlery was first produced in 1948, using surplus military knife blades then available at a fraction of their value. Early on, Rada utilized various buildings to meet their needs. One was a fortified military radar base used to monitor air space during the Cold War. In 1986, manufacturing operations moved to the current facility, which has since been expanded.

References

External links
 

Kitchenware brands
Direct sales companies
Manufacturing companies based in Iowa
American companies established in 1948
Manufacturing companies established in 1948